Kothayam is a Village Panchayat under Thoppampatti Union of oddanchatram Taluk, Dindigul district, Tamil Nadu. It has seven small Villages attached to it for Administrative Purposes.It includes Aruvankattuvalasu, Marriamman Temple Vallakkundapuram, Veeragirikottai, Vedikaranvalasu, Thhethagoundenvalasu, Koothampattiyanvalasu and Kondavanayakanvalasu village.

Villages in Dindigul district